Mubarak Al-Kabeer Governorate   ( Muḥāfaẓat Mubārak al-Kabīr)   is one of the governorates of Kuwait which mainly houses residential areas of Kuwait City. It was formed in 2000 when the Hawalli Governorate was split in two.

Districts within the governorate include:

 Abu Al Hasaniya
 Abu Futaira
 Adān
 Al Qurain
 Al-Qusour
 Fintās
 Funaitīs
 Misīla
 Mubarak Al-Kabeer
 Sabah Al-Salem
 Sabhān
 South Wista
 Wista

References

 
Governorates of Kuwait